Sheikh Obekr or Obekir is a holy figure venerated in Yazidism, he is considered one of the Seven Divine Beings, to all of whom God assigned the World's affairs, and his 13th century earthly incarnation is considered the founding patriarch of the Qatani lineage of Sheikhs.

He is identified as the bearer and protector of Xerqa, a holy black textile which symbolizes asceticism in Yazidism. He is identified with the angel Derdayil and is in charge of the equilibrium between earth and heaven.

References

13th-century births
13th-century deaths
13th-century Kurdish people
Yazidi holy figures